Monardella follettii is an uncommon species of flowering plant in the mint family known by the common name Follett's monardella.

Distribution
Monardella follettii is endemic to California, where it is known from about twenty occurrences in the northern High Sierra Nevada, mostly in Plumas County — in the Lassen National Forest.

It grows in rocky mountain forests and slopes, sometimes on serpentine soils.

Description
Monardella follettii is a perennial herb producing a slender erect stem which is purple in color and mostly hairless in texture. The lance-shaped, smooth-edged leaves are oppositely arranged about the stem.

The inflorescence is a head of several pink flowers blooming in a cup of leathery, hairy, glandular bracts.

External links
  Calflora Database: Monardella follettii (Follett's monardella)
 Jepson Manual eFlora (TJM2) treatment of Monardella follettii
 USDA Plants Profile for Monardella follettii
 UC Photos gallery: Monardella follettii

follettii
Endemic flora of California
Flora of the Sierra Nevada (United States)
~
Natural history of Plumas County, California
Taxa named by Willis Linn Jepson